The Papists Act 1734 (8 Geo. 2, c. 25) was an Act of Parliament passed by the Parliament of Great Britain during the reign of George II. Its long title was "An act to indemnify protestant purchasers of estates of papists, against the penalties or forfeitures papists are liable to for not having enrolled their estates, in pursuance of an act of the third year of king George the first for that purpose".

Notes

Great Britain Acts of Parliament 1734